Terris may refer to:

Arts
 Legends of Terris, a text-based game by English game designer Paul Barnett
 Terris (band), Welsh indie band

People

Surname
 Archibald Terris (1873–1938), coal miner and political figure
 John Terris (born 1939), New Zealand politician, priest and broadcaster
 Harold A. Terris (1916–2001), military pilot, civil servant, and politician
 Malcolm Terris (born 1941), British actor
 Norma Terris (1904–1989), American musical theatre star
 Norma Terris Theatre, a theatre in Chester, Connecticut
 Sid Terris (1904–1974), top rated American lightweight boxing contender

Given name
 Terris Moore (1908–1993), explorer, mountaineer, pilot, and second president of the University of Alaska

Religion
 Association of Catholic Clergy Pacem in Terris, a regime-sponsored organisation of Catholic clergy in the communist Czechoslovakia
 Pacem in terris, a papal encyclical issued by Pope John XXIII on 11 April 1963
 Pacem in Terris Award, a Catholic peace award